Grand Rapids Christian Schools is a Christian private school system in Kent County, Michigan, serving grades K-12. Most of its campuses are in Grand Rapids while one is in Rockford. Its administrative headquarters are in Grand Rapids.

 Tom DeJonge is the superintendent of the system.

History
Circa 2004 the school had a debt of about $20 million, and in 2009 the debt was down to $12.5 million; the school had incurred debt partly due to renovations of the Millbrook school and the construction of the Rockford school. That year Richard DeVos and Helen DeVos gave a donation of $10 million, and the debt was reduced to $2.5 million.

Members of the DeVos family have consistently donated to the school system: the Dick and Betsy DeVos Family Foundation gave the school system $2,390,000 in the years 1999 through 2014. In 2013 members of the DeVos family donated a total of over $6.8 million to the school, including $3.2 million from Doug DeVos, $300,000 from Dick DeVos, and $20,400 from Dan DeVos. DeJonge is a personal friend of the family, including U.S. Secretary of Education Betsy DeVos, who enrolled her children in this school system. In 2017 Erica L. Green of The New York Times wrote "Ms. [Betsy] DeVos is still involved in the school." She added that Betsy DeVos and her husband Dick "are known to be very generous to Grand Rapids Christian High School".

Circa 2013 the system faced an increase in enrollment.

Operations
 the school did not use money from tuition to cover debts.

Demographics
 racial groups other than non-Hispanic white make up about a quarter the school system's students. Betsy DeVos stated that the Grand Rapids Christian School student body had more ethnic diversity than that of the public schools in Ada Township, Michigan. About 30% of the student body is eligible for school food service at a lower price and/or at no price at all. DeJonge expressed pride that the school enrolls students reliant on public transportation and students on scholarships.

The school system gives financial assistance to about 45% of the students.

Curriculum
The curriculum includes Christianity-related topics and topics about other religions. Students study both the theory of evolution and Creationism.

Culture
Green wrote in 2017 that "the school looked like a relaxed comprehensive public high school".

Schools
All campuses are in Grand Rapids unless otherwise noted.
 Grand Rapids Christian High School (9-12)
 Grand Rapids Christian Middle School (5-8)
 In 2013 the middle school had 435 students. In September 2013 Grand Rapids Christian Schools offered to buy the Shawnee Park Math/Science/Technology Academy building for its middle school for $800,000 from Grand Rapids Public Schools. The school, which closed in 2013, was perennially underutilized due to an area preference for religious schools. The district accepted the offer in 2014. The previous middle school facility, also the Evergreen Campus, was built in 1955. DeJonge stated that using a new building would cost less than renovating the existing space for a middle school purpose, and that the new building has more potential uses. The move of the middle school to the current site was scheduled for 2015.
 Rockford Christian School (PreK-8) - Rockford
 Christian Elementary Evergreen Campus (PreK-5)
 The building it occupies was built in 1955. The middle school was previously co-located; it was scheduled to move out in 2015.
 Christian Elementary Iroquois Campus (PreK-4)

One of the elementary buildings had a cost of $12.5 million.

The system includes the Richard and Helen DeVos Center for Arts and Worship, within the high school facility. It was a result of a donation by Richard DeVos circa 1998. Prior to the center's establishment, the high school students attended chapel at multiple churches because they could not fit in the same church building.

Notable alumni
Multiple members of the DeVos family attended, including:
 Helen DeVos (Helen Van Wesep)
 Richard DeVos - graduated from the high school in 1944

References

Further reading
  - Snippets at Google Books

External links

 Grand Rapids Christian Schools

Private K-12 schools in Michigan
Christian schools in Michigan
Schools in Grand Rapids, Michigan
Schools in Kent County, Michigan